Kangru is a small borough in Kiili Parish, Harju County, Estonia.

Kangru may also refer to:
Kangru, Pärnu County, a village in Halinga Parish, Pärnu County, Estonia
Kangru, Rapla County, a village in Märjamaa Parish, Rapla County, Estonia

See also
Kangur
Kangro (disambiguation)